"Anata no Soba de" is Crystal Kay's 21st single, it was released on May 16, 2007. It is Kay's third and final single from the album All Yours after "Konna ni Chikaku de..." in February. This single was seen as a summer love anthem which described the feelings of a lover feeling less closer to their loved one. This track exuded a pulsing R&B beat which certifies it as a more urban sounding song. The single only featured one track and thus was released at a lower price of ¥525.

Track listing

Charts 

2007 singles
2007 songs
Crystal Kay songs
Epic Records singles